David John Thomas (born 29 August 1937) is a British boxer.

Career
He competed in the men's heavyweight event at the 1960 Summer Olympics. At the 1960 Summer Olympics, he lost to Josef Němec of Czechoslovakia. He also represented England and won a silver medal in the -91 Kg category at the 1958 British Empire and Commonwealth Games in Cardiff, Wales.

Thomas is a Amateur Boxing Association of England three times heavyweight champion (1957, 1958, 1959) when boxing out of the Polytechnic Boxing Club.

References

External links
 

1937 births
Living people
British male boxers
Olympic boxers of Great Britain
Boxers at the 1960 Summer Olympics
Boxers from Greater London
Commonwealth Games medallists in boxing
Boxers at the 1958 British Empire and Commonwealth Games
Commonwealth Games silver medallists for England
Heavyweight boxers
Medallists at the 1958 British Empire and Commonwealth Games